Ji Ha-yoon (born Ji Yoon-mi on February 10, 1995) is a South Korean actress and model.

Filmography

Television series

Music videos

References

External links
 
 
 

1995 births
Living people
People from Seoul
21st-century South Korean actresses
South Korean television actresses
Konyang University alumni